Oni is a district of Georgia, in the region of Racha-Lechkhumi and Kvemo Svaneti. Its main town is Oni.

Geography  
Oni Municipality borders Lentekhi Municipality to the northwest, Ambrolauri Municipality to the west, both in the Racha-Lechkhumi and Kvemo Svaneti region. To the south Oni Municipality borders the Sachkhere Municipality in the Imereti region, and to the southeast de jure has border with the Java Municipality in the Shida Kartli region. In the north to the east it is limited the Georgia–Russia border primerely with Republic of North Ossetia-Alania and a short section with the Republic of Kabardino-Balkaria.

History
Until 1917, the actual Oni municipality was a part of the Racha uyezd in the Kutaisi Governorate, from 1917 to 1928 it was a part of Racha uyezd, from 1929, it was a part of Racha-Lechkhumi uyezd and from 1930, it became an independent rayon. In 1963–1964, it was a part of Ambrolauri Municipality. And became in 1965, an independent rayon. In 1991, it was unified with a part of Java Municipality but this part is actually occupied by separatists.

Demographic

Population evolution

Ethnic Groups

99,07% of the population is Georgian, 0,36% is Ossetian, 0,20% is Jews, 0,10% is Russian and 0,10% is Armenian (2014).

Politics
Tsageri Municipal Assembly (Georgian: ცაგერის საკრებულო, Tsageri Sakrebulo) is a representative body in Tsageri Municipality, consisting of 30 members which is elected every four years. The last election was held in October 2021. Sergo Khidesheli of Georgian Dream was elected mayor.

See also 
 List of municipalities in Georgia (country)

External links 
 Districts of Georgia, Statoids.com

References 

Municipalities of Racha-Lechkhumi and Kvemo Svaneti